Marchelino Mandagi (born February 16, 1990 in Tomohon) is an Indonesian footballer who currently plays for Persiwa Wamena in the Indonesia Super League.

Club career statistics

Honours

Club honors
Persisam Putra Samarinda
Premier Division (1): 2008–09

References

External links

1990 births
Living people
People from Tomohon
Sportspeople from North Sulawesi
Association football defenders
Association football midfielders
Indonesian Christians
Indonesian footballers
Liga 1 (Indonesia) players
Bontang F.C. players
Persiwa Wamena players
Indonesian Premier Division players
Persisam Putra Samarinda players